Hornful of Soul (also released as Catwalk) is an album by American trombonist Bennie Green recorded in 1960 and released on the Bethlehem label.

Reception

The Allmusic review by Scott Yanow awarded the album 4 stars calling it "Fine music that has long been overlooked".

Track listing
All compositions by Bennie Green except as indicated
 "Summertime" (George Gershwin, Ira Gershwin, DuBose Heyward) - 4:55  
 "Groove One" - 5:01  
 "Lowland-Ism" (Babs Gonzales) - 6:24  
 "Dibblin' and Dabblin'" (Gonzales) - 2:54  
 "My Foolish Heart" (Ned Washington, Victor Young) - 4:03  
 "(Back Home Again in) Indiana" (James F. Hanley, Ballard MacDonald) - 4:34  
 "Catwalk" (Mal Waldron) - 5:37  
 "Dee Dee" (Lem Davis) - 5:24
Recorded in New York City in December, 1960.

Personnel
Bennie Green - trombone
Lem Davis - alto saxophone (tracks 2-4, 6 & 7)
Jimmy Forrest - tenor saxophone  (tracks 1-4, 6 & 7)
Mal Waldron - piano (tracks 2-4, 6 & 7) 
Skip Hall - organ (tracks 1, 5 & 6)
Wyatt Ruther - bass
Art Taylor - drums
Tommy Lopez - conga (tracks 1 & 6)

References 

Bethlehem Records albums
Bennie Green albums
1961 albums